Altolamprologus is a small genus of pseudocrenilabrine cichlids endemic to Lake Tanganyika in eastern Africa. They inhabit areas of the lake with large amounts of rock, most frequently in water two to ten metres in depth. Two formally described species comprise this genus, with perhaps one dwarf A. compressiceps-like species being considered an undescribed species by some.

Species
There are currently two recognized species in this genus:
 Altolamprologus calvus (Poll, 1978)
 Altolamprologus compressiceps (Boulenger, 1898)

Description 
Their bodies are laterally compressed and remarkably high-backed; hence the scientific name which means "high Lamprologus" (from Latin altus, "high"). They are predators which feed on large invertebrates and small fish, particularly crustaceans and juveniles of other cichlids.

In the aquarium
Altolamprologus are hardy at the standard Lake Tanganyikan water parameters. They are not particularly well-suited for beginners due to their predatory habits however. They can be picky eaters and demand a variety of appropriate living prey to thrive, but they are also prone to gorging themselves if they like the offered food and may become too fat. They also require large tanks – at least one meter/yard in length – to show their natural behavior, and cannot be kept together with small fish or shrimps.

They can be a challenge to breed for the novice. These fish are cave spawners and will spawn under terracotta pot saucers or in large snail shells. They are a rather slow growing Lamprologine taking approximately two years to reach sexual maturity.

References

  (2007): Phylogenetic relationships of the Lake Tanganyika cichlid tribe Lamprologini: The story from mitochondrial DNA. Mol. Phylogenet. Evol. 45(2): 629–642. 
  (1998): Tanganyikan cichlids in their natural habitat. Cichlid Press.

 
Lamprologini

Fishkeeping
Cichlid genera
Taxa named by Max Poll